John Mark Moore is a South African artist whose passion for wildlife and natural heritage visually fuses themes of spirituality and mysticism. John is a Master Printmaker and has also held teaching positions at Crawford College in Lonehill, Wits Technikon, St. Andrews School, St. John's College and Parktown College. He assisted Philippa Hobbs as a technical printer, from 1993 to 1996.

John Moore's art 
In addition to depictions of wildlife and the plight of endangered species, his work often also includes references to Southern Africa's ancient San- and Koi- bushman rock painting heritage. He represents nature from a conceptual point of view. His style contains elements of the surreal, tension between esoteric polymorphism and traditional naturalism which he believes allows the viewer to find their own interpretation of the work and allows it to speak to them personally.

Background 
Having grown up in Johannesburg and spending many holidays in the bush, his interaction with the wildlife led to a growing desire to produce wildlife art depicting their interaction in nature. He chose the printmaking medium because it enables one to produce editions and therefore is accessible to more people.

He has donated funds to World Wildlife Fund (WWF) and Endangered Wildlife Trust (EWT) and has created specific works for charity fund raising, e.g., Red Nose Day where the work was used as advertising on signboards throughout South Africa. He has also done a commission for Life Line. He completed a work for the Nelson Mandela Children's Fund, which was donated to charity. His most recent donation was a colour woodblock for National AIDS day. He has had several exhibitions, both solo and combined with other artists, in South Africa and overseas.

External links 
John Moore's Online Store

South African artists
Living people
Year of birth missing (living people)